Shibalihe is a metro station of Zhengzhou Metro Chengjiao line.

Station layout  
The station has a station building where the station concourse is located on the ground level. The platforms are on the underground B1 level. The station has 2 parallel island platforms and 4 platforms in total. Currently only the inner 2 platforms are in use and the outer 2 platforms are not for service.

Exits

Future developments
According to the plan, the station will become the southern terminus of Line 2 in the future, and cross-platform interchange between Line 2 and Line 9 (of which the first phase is called the Chengjiao line) at this station will be realized.

References 

Stations of Zhengzhou Metro
Chengjiao line, Zhengzhou Metro
Railway stations in China opened in 2017